Kaoru Kobayashi (小林薫 Kobayashi Kaoru) is a Japanese personal name:
 Kaoru Kobayashi (actor), born on September 4, 1951) is a Japanese actor born in Kyoto in Japan
 Kaoru Kobayashi (murderer), a pedophile who in 2004 murdered Kaede Ariyama in Nara in Japan